Victoria Mansions is a residential Category II heritage building in central Christchurch, New Zealand.

Heathcote Helmore had the commission in 1931 to design the building; he designed in Art Deco as was fashionable at the time. In March 1935, Victoria Mansions Limited was formed to undertake the development. They expected to pay NZ£2,800 for the land and NZ£18,000 for the building. Construction started in June 1935, with five apartments on each floor, plus a single rooftop apartment, making 21 apartments in total. A small restaurant was attached on the Victoria Street frontage, with adjacent garages. Apartments were ready for occupation in May 1936.

The building was damaged in the February 2011 Christchurch earthquake and has since stood empty. The adjoining restaurant was demolished after the earthquakes. In 2020, it was announced that the building will be restored, and a fifth storey added for two rooftop penthouses.

Notable occupiers
 Henry Cotterill (1855–1943), of Duncan Cotterill (law firm); from 1936

References

Buildings and structures in Christchurch
Heritage New Zealand Category 2 historic places in Canterbury, New Zealand
Christchurch Central City
1930s architecture in New Zealand
Residential buildings completed in 1936
Art Deco architecture in New Zealand